Anywhere but Here is the second studio album by American rock band Mayday Parade. In January 2009 the band started writing Anywhere but Here, working with several co-writers. The band signed to Atlantic in March 2009. Later that month, the band started recording at House of Loud in Elmwood Park, New Jersey. The album's production was handled by producer David Bendeth. "The Silence" was released as a single in August and was followed by Anywhere but Here, released through Fearless Records, a couple of months later. "Kids in Love" was released as a single in May 2010. "Anywhere but Here" was released as a single in September.

Background and recording
Vocalist/guitarist Jason Lancaster left Mayday Parade in March 2007 citing a lack of writing credit on the band's releases. Bassist Jeremy Lenzo and drummer Jake Bundrick filled in for Lancaster's vocals, while guitarists Alex Garcia and Brooks Betts performed Lancaster's guitar parts. The band's debut album, A Lesson in Romantics, was released in July through independent label Fearless Records. In early January 2009, the band began the writing process for a new album, which was expected to be released in the summer through Fearless Records. On March 31, it was announced the band had signed to major label Atlantic Records.

In late March, the band entered the studio with 50 songs. On March 30, the band started recording. The group picked the 11 best songs, plus a couple that were later released on the deluxe edition. The album was recorded and mixed at House of Loud in Elmwood Park, New Jersey with producer David Bendeth. The band were initially in talks with two other producers but chose Bendeth, according to Sanders, as "it just really made sense. [...] He brought a lot to the songs and we even did a little bit of writing with him." Sanders also mentioned that Bendeth "had a lot more to do with everything and had a heavier hand in everything". Bundrick said Bendeth put him through "drummer boot camp" and revealed that Bendeth is "not afraid to tell you how he feels about your playing or how much you may suck in a certain area." The group let Bendeth have his way as they "didn't really want to make Atlantic mad."

Composition
Bundrick claimed the band didn't want to make this new album "too different", compared to A Lesson in Romantics. The band focused on "making the heavy parts heavier and the sad parts more sad." Sanders later recalled that "there was a lot of outside influence" from Atlantic Records that resulted in "a lot of co-writes". The label expected the band to release a pop album. While the band attempted to follow this direction, they were weighed down by "so much overbearing pressure", according to Betts.

"Kids in Love" was written by the band and Gregg Wattenberg. "Anywhere But Here" was written by the band and David Hodges. "The Silence", "If You Can't Live Without Me, Why Aren't You Dead Yet?", "Save Your Heart", and "Get Up" were written by the band and Bobby Huff. "Still Breathing" was written by the band and Dave Bassett. "Bruised and Scarred" was written by the band, Huff, and David Bendeth. "Center of Attention" was written by the band, Sam Hollander, and Dave Katz. "I Swear This Time I Mean It" and "The End" were written by the band.

Release
In mid-June 2009, Sanders performed an untitled new song during a show in New Jersey. On June 24, the band's next album was announced for release in October. In July and August, the band went on a tour of the US with Metro Station. On July 28, the album's title was revealed: Anywhere but Here. The title-track was made available for streaming via Myspace the following day. "The Silence" was released as a single on August 4. On August 20, the album's track listing was revealed. On September 1, the album's art work was revealed. The art work was done by John Ryan Solis, while Kristie Borgmann was the art manager and Alex Kirzhner helped with the design. On September 15, a music video was released for "Anywhere by Here" via Myspace. Between September 24 and November 14, the band went on the AP Fall Ball Tour, alongside The Academy Is..., Set Your Goals, The Secret Handshake and You Me at Six.

On September 29, 2009 a music video was released for "The Silence" via mtvU. The video was directed by RAGE. It shows a woman who is close to having a nervous breakdown, with scenes of the band performing in an abandoned trailer park. That same day, "Get Up" was made available for streaming. Anywhere but Here was released on October 6 through Atlantic. On the same day, "The Silence" was released to radio, and again on November 3. In November and December, the band toured with The Dangerous Summer. Between January and March 2010, the band went on the 2010 edition of the Take Action Tour, supporting We the Kings. In February, it was announced that a music video was being filmed for "Kids in Love". The band supported Madina Lake on their tour of Europe between late March and mid April.

A music video for "Kids in Love" was released on April 1, 2010, but was shortly removed. The video was directed by Josh Mond. The video features a graphic depiction of a group of people on a road trip, taking drugs engaging in various sexual acts and streaking through a desert. Sanders explained that the band wanted to do something different from their previous music videos. Upon seeing the plot for the "Kids in Love" video the group thought it was "really cool and really interesting. It would get people talking". However, after seeing the final version, Sanders was "pretty shocked" and found it more explicit than intended. The band's fans were upset with the video. Eventually, the band released a "clean" version of the video. "Kids in Love" was released to mainstream radio on April 6, and released as a single on May 18.

In May 2010, the band supported Sing It Loud. The band went on the 2010 edition of Warped Tour. On September 20, "Anywhere but Here" was released as a single. In September and October, the band went on a UK tour with The Maine. The band headlined the Fearless Friends Tour, with support from Breathe Carolina, Every Avenue, Artist vs. Poet, and Go Radio, in October and November. This became the band's first ever headlining tour. A music video for "Get Up" was released on January 31, 2011. The band would later record "Kids in Love" and "Bruised and Scarred" acoustically for the Valdosta (2011) EP.

Reception

The album generally received mixed to positive reviews from critics. In his review for AllMusic, Andrew Leahey commented that the album was "entirely risk-free" but that the band does "an adequate job".

Anywhere but Here debuted at number 31 on the Billboard 200. In retrospect, Sanders said the band simply recorded songs that they "didn't care about as much or love as much". Brooks pointed out that it wasn't "the best representation [of the band]."

Track listing
All arrangements by Mayday Parade and David Bendeth.

"Kids in Love" (Mayday Parade, Gregg Wattenberg) – 3:36
"Anywhere But Here" (Mayday Parade, David Hodges) – 3:09
"The Silence" (Mayday Parade, Bobby Huff) – 3:35
"Still Breathing" (Mayday Parade, Dave Bassett) – 3:52
"Bruised and Scarred" (Mayday Parade, Huff, David Bendeth) – 3:23
"If You Can't Live Without Me, Why Aren't You Dead Yet?" (Mayday Parade, Huff) – 3:38
"Save Your Heart" (Mayday Parade, Huff) – 3:42
"Get Up" (Mayday Parade, Huff) – 3:03
"Center of Attention" (Mayday Parade, Sam Hollander, Dave Katz) – 3:01
"I Swear This Time I Mean It" (Mayday Parade) – 4:01
"The End" (Mayday Parade) – 3:37

Bonus tracks

Personnel
Personnel per digital booklet.

Mayday Parade
 Brooks Betts – rhythm guitar
 Jake Bundrick – drums, backing vocals
 Derek Sanders – lead vocals, keyboards, acoustic guitar
 Alex Garcia – lead guitar
 Jeremy Lenzo – bass guitar, backing vocals

Production
 David Bendeth – producer, mixing
 Dan Korneff – digital editing, engineer, mixing engineer
 John Bender – digital editing, engineer
 Kato Khandwala – digital editing, engineer
 Mitch Milan – assistant engineer
 Alex Kirzhner – art direction, design
 John Ryan Solis – cover illustration
 Connie Makita – secret art friend
 Andrew Zaeh – photography
 Kristie Borgmann – art manager
 Michelle Piza – packaging manager

Charts

References
Footnotes

 Citations

External links

Anywhere but Here at YouTube (streamed copy where licensed)

2009 albums
Mayday Parade albums
Albums produced by David Bendeth
Atlantic Records albums
Fearless Records albums